Neurothemis taiwanensis is a species of skimmer in the dragonfly family Libellulidae. It is found in Taiwan.

References

External links

 

Libellulidae
Insects described in 2016